Jack Warner, OBE (born Horace John Waters, 24 October 1895 – 24 May 1981) was a British actor. He is closely associated with the role of PC George Dixon, which he played in the 1950 film The Blue Lamp and later in the television series Dixon of Dock Green from 1955 until 1976, but he was also for some years one of Britain's most popular film stars.

Early life
Warner was born Horace John Waters in Bromley, Poplar, London, the third child of Edward William Waters, master fulling maker and undertaker's warehouseman, and Maud Mary Best. His sisters, Elsie and Doris Waters, were comediennes who usually performed as "Gert and Daisy".

Warner attended the Coopers' Company's Grammar School for Boys in Mile End, while his sisters both attended the nearby sister school, Coborn School for Girls in Bow. The three children were choristers at St. Leonard's Church, Bromley-by-Bow, and for a time, Warner was the choir's soloist.

After leaving school, he studied automobile engineering at the Northampton Institute (now part of the City University, London) but being more practical than academic he left after a year to work at the repair facilities of F.W. Berwick and Company in Balham, where he started by sweeping the floors for 2d per hour. Frederick William Berwick became a partner in the Anglo-French automobile manufacturing company Sizaire-Berwick and, in August 1913, Warner was sent to work as a mechanic in Paris. He drove completed chassis to the coast from where they were shipped to England, road-testing them en route. He acquired a working knowledge of French which stood him in good stead throughout his life; an imitation of Maurice Chevalier became a part of his repertoire.

During the First World War, he served in France as a driver in the Royal Flying Corps and was awarded the Meritorious Service Medal in 1918. He returned to England and the motor trade in 1919, graduating from hearses to occasional car racing at Brooklands. He was over thirty before he became a professional entertainer.

Career
Warner first became known to the general public in music hall and radio. By the early years of the Second World War, he was nationally known and starred in a BBC radio comedy show, Garrison Theatre, invariably opening with "A Monologue Entitled...".

Film
Warner's first film was The Dummy Talks (1943), in which he had the lead role. He had a support role in The Captive Heart (1946), a successful film. Also successful were Hue and Cry and Dear Murderer (both 1947). Warner was the patriarch of the Huggett family in Holiday Camp (1947) which was a big hit. He played a policeman in It Always Rains on Sunday (1947), and was another family man in the comedy Easy Money (1948).

He was in a war film, Against the Wind (1948), and starred in a thriller, My Brother's Keeper (1948). The Huggett family had been so well received in Holiday Camp that production company Gainsborough Pictures decided to give them their own series, so Warner was seen in Here Come the Huggetts (1948), Vote for Huggett (1949) and The Huggetts Abroad (1949). He was one of several names in Train of Events and played the governor of a borstal institution in Boys in Brown (both 1949).

Warner was by now established as one of the most popular British actors in the country. His stock rose further when he played PC George Dixon in The Blue Lamp (1950), the most successful film at the box office that year. One observer predicted, "This film will make Jack the most famous policeman in Britain."

Warner performed in a comedy Talk of a Million (1951) and a thriller Valley of Eagles (1951). He had a small part in Scrooge (1951) then played a policeman again in Emergency Call (1952). He was one of several stars in Meet Me Tonight (1952) and returned to comedy for Those People Next Door (1953). He was top-billed in The Square Ring and The Final Test (both 1953). In the POW film Albert R.N. (1953) he was billed beneath Anthony Steel.

Additional thrillers followed: Bang! You're Dead (1954) and Forbidden Cargo (1954). He co-starred in the Hammer film version of The Quatermass Xperiment (1955) and had a cameo-like supporting role as the police superintendent in the 1955 Ealing Studios black comedy The Ladykillers.

Even with his success that followed in television, Warner performed in the occasional film such as Now and Forever (1956), Home and Away (1956), Carve Her Name with Pride (1958) and Jigsaw (1962). His last film appearance was in Dominique (1978).

Television
Although the police constable he played in The Blue Lamp was shot dead in the film, the character was revived in 1955 for the BBC television series Dixon of Dock Green, which ran until 1976. In the series' later years, Warner's character, long past retirement age, was confined to a less prominent desk sergeant role. The series had a prime-time slot on Saturday evenings, and always opened with Dixon giving a little soliloquy to the camera, beginning with the words, "Good evening, all". According to Warner's autobiography, Jack of All Trades, Queen Elizabeth II once visited the television studio where the series was made, and told Warner "that she thought Dixon of Dock Green had become part of the British way of life".

Personal life and death 
In 1933, Warner married company secretary Muriel Winifred ("Mollie"), daughter of independently wealthy Roberts Peters. The couple had no children.

Warner was appointed an Officer of the Order of the British Empire (OBE) in 1965. In 1973, he was made a Freeman of the City of London. Warner commented in his autobiography that the honour "entitles me to a set of 18th century rules for the conduct of life urging me to be sober and temperate". Warner added, "Not too difficult with Dixon to keep an eye on me!"

He died, aged 85, of pneumonia in the Royal Masonic Hospital, Ravenscourt Park, Hammersmith, London, in 1981. The characterisation by Warner of Dixon was held in such high regard that officers from Paddington Green Police Station bore the coffin at his funeral.

Warner is buried in East London Cemetery.

Filmography

Box-office ranking
For a number of years, British film exhibitors voted him among the top ten British stars at the box office via an annual poll in the Motion Picture Herald.
1948 – 7th-most popular British star
1949 – 10th-most popular British star
1950 – 3rd (5th-most popular overall)
1952 – 8th-most popular British star
1953 – 7th-most popular British star

Notes

References
 Sydney-Smith, Susan (2002). Beyond Dixon of Dock Green: Early British Police Series. London: I. B. Tauris. 
Warner, Jack (1975). Jack of All Trades: The Autobiography of Jack Warner. London: W.H. Allen.

External links
 Jack Warner British movie community
 

1895 births
1981 deaths
English male film actors
English male stage actors
English male television actors
Male actors from London
Officers of the Order of the British Empire
20th-century English male actors
People from Poplar, London
British male comedy actors
Deaths from pneumonia in England